Red Eagle may refer to:

People 
Jay Red Eagle, Cherokee flutist
William Weatherford (1781–1824), Creek Indian known as Red Eagle

Places 
Red Eagle Mountain, Montana
Red Eagle Lake, Montana
Red Eagle Glacier, Montana

Ships 
, a coaster which sank in Singapore in 1975
, a car ferry operated by Red Funnel between the Isle of Wight and the British mainland

Military
4th Infantry Division (India), an Indian Army unit known as the Red Eagle Division
4477th Tactical Evaluation Squadron, a United States Air Force squadron known as the Red Eagles
Operation Red Eagle, a 2007 Iraq War coalition counterinsurgency operation
Red Eagles, the armed wing of the Communist PFLP renamed Abu Ali Mustapha Brigades in 2004

Sports teams
Timrå IK, a Swedish top-division hockey team known as the Red Eagles
Red Eagle FC, a Cambodian top-division football team
Rojos del Águila de Veracruz (Veracruz Red Eagles), a Mexican League AAA-level team

Film and television
The Red Eagle, a 2010 Thai film
The English title of Águila Roja, a Spanish adventure television series

Other uses
Red Eagle Formation, a geologic formation of limestone and shale in Kansas and Oklahoma
Order of the Red Eagle, a Prussian chivalric order